G. Patrick Murphy (born 1948) is a former United States district judge of the United States District Court for the Southern District of Illinois.

Education and career

Born in Carbondale, Illinois, Murphy was in the United States Marine Corps during the Vietnam War, from 1966 to 1969, and then received a Bachelor of Science degree from Southern Illinois University in 1974 and a Juris Doctor from Southern Illinois University School of Law in 1978. He was in private practice in Marion, Illinois from 1978 to 1998, and is doing so again after his tenure as a federal judge ended.

Federal judicial service

On July 31, 1997, Murphy was nominated by President Bill Clinton to a seat on the United States District Court for the Southern District of Illinois vacated by William D. Stiehl. Murphy was confirmed by the United States Senate on April 2, 1998, and received his commission on April 3, 1998. He served as chief judge from 2000 to 2007. He retired on December 1, 2013.

Sources

1948 births
Living people
Judges of the United States District Court for the Southern District of Illinois
United States district court judges appointed by Bill Clinton
United States Marines
Southern Illinois University Carbondale alumni
People from Carbondale, Illinois
Southern Illinois University School of Law alumni
20th-century American judges
21st-century American judges